Maharashtracha Superstar is an Indian television series that premiered on Zee Marathi in 2009. It is a talent show for aspiring actors. The show returned for its second season in 2020. The series premiered on 17 December 2009 from Wednesday and Thursday at 9.30 pm by replacing Hapta Band.

Concept
Maharashtracha Superstar focusing on acting. The show hunts for aspiring artists who can show drama, performing a series of task to test their creativity, spontaneity and acting capabilities. It is a platform for every maharashtrian youth who dreams of making it in the acting. It was feature participants from various cities of Maharashtra. The aim of the show is to find potential Maharashtracha Superstar.

Season summary

Season 1 
The winners of the first season were Nilesh Sable and Yogini Chouk.

Season 2 
The winner of the second season is Atharva Karve and runner ups are Ruchika Khot and Sonam Mhasvekar.

References

External links 
 Maharashtracha Superstar at ZEE5

Indian reality television series
2009 Indian television series debuts
2020 Indian television series debuts
Zee Marathi original programming
Marathi-language television shows
2020 Indian television series endings
2010 Indian television series endings